The Wolf Hunters is a 1949 American Northern film directed by Budd Boetticher and starring Kirby Grant, Jan Clayton and Edward Norris. It was based on the novel of the same title by James Oliver Curwood, which had previously been adapted in 1926 as The Wolf Hunters and in 1934 as The Trail Beyond starring John Wayne, Noah Beery, Sr. and Noah Beery, Jr. The film was the second in a series of ten films featuring Kirby Grant as a Canadian Mountie.

Cast
 Kirby Grant as RCMP Corporal Rod Webb 
 Jan Clayton as Renée 
 Edward Norris as Paul Lautrec 
 Helen Parrish as Marcia Cameron 
 Charles Lang as J. L. McTavish 
 Ted Hecht as Muskoka 
 Luther Crockett as Supt. Edward Cameron 
 Elizabeth Root as Minnetaki 
 Chinook as Chinook, Webb's dog

Production
Budd Boetticher later recalled, "Monogram! That was really second rate! Wolf Hunters was an outdoor picture, kind of an "in the snow" thing, and I put all my friends in it who were out of work. Jan clayton, Kirby Grant, everyone I knew who was out of a job. It was twelve days; just terrible".

See also
 Trail of the Yukon (1949)
 Snow Dog (1950)
 Call of the Klondike (1950)
 Northwest Territory (1951)
 Yukon Manhunt (1951)
 Yukon Gold (1952)
 Fangs of the Arctic (1953)
 Northern Patrol (1953)
 Yukon Vengeance (1954)

References

Bibliography
 Drew, Bernard. Motion Picture Series and Sequels: A Reference Guide. Routledge, 2013. 
 McGhee, Richard D. John Wayne: Actor, Artist, Hero. McFarland, 1999.

External links
 

1949 films
1949 Western (genre) films
American Western (genre) films
American black-and-white films
Corporal Rod Webb (film series)
Films based on American novels
Films based on novels by James Oliver Curwood
Films directed by Budd Boetticher
Films produced by Lindsley Parsons
Monogram Pictures films
Northern (genre) films
Royal Canadian Mounted Police in fiction
1940s English-language films
1940s American films